Karol Szwedowski (1889-1941) entitled to Korwin coat of arms was a Polish builder, contracted to work at Westerplatte. He was one of the civilian defenders of this installation when Poland was invaded by Germany in 1939.

Early life and career

On December 13, 1927, at the age of 38, he received the diploma of master builder and was accepted to the Craftsmen's Guild of the city of Pułtusk.  On April 4, 1934, he arrived in Gdańsk from Legionowo.  He was hired as a contract worker by the Military Transit Depot of Westerplatte.  He worked there seasonally until 1939.

Battle of Westerplatte

During the Battle of Westerplatte on September 1–7, 1939, Szwedowski was called on as a civilian defender, and assisted the wounded and fighting soldiers.

After the battle was over, Szwedowski was arrested and sent to the camp Stutthof.  At first it was thought that he perished in this camp, but there is evidence to the contrary in the form of a death certificate issued on the basis of the record books for the day of August 30, 1941 in the General Governorship in Legionowo (document number 105 of the year 1941).  The death certificate states that Karol Szwedowski, son of Jacenty (father) and Jozefa (mother), died in Legionowo at Bukowiec on August 30, 1941, at the age of 52.

Karol's son Ryszard Szwedowski was an officer in the Polish Army, who was killed by the Germans in Palmiry. 

Szwedowski is mentioned in the book Westerplatte published by Wydawnictwo Ministerstwa Obrony Narodowej (the Publishing House of the Ministry of National Defense) in Warsaw in 1978. He was played by Bolesław Płotnicki in the 1967 feature film Westerplatte directed by Stanisław Rozewicz and in 2013 Polish film Tajemnica Westerplatte ("The Secret of Westerplatte") he was played by Romuald Kłos.

1889 births
1941 deaths
Polish people of World War II
Polish civilians killed in World War II
Polish people who died in the Holocaust